Michael John Gilbert (born 16 July 1980) is a former professional wrestler, better known by his ring name Mikey Whiplash. He currently resides in Glasgow, Scotland and wrestled for numerous promotions in the British Independent circuit, most notably Insane Championship Wrestling where he is a former ICW Heavyweight Champion and Zero-G Champion. Between 2002 and 2012 he was a full-time regular for All Star Wrestling. Gilbert has also wrestled for London-based promotion Progress Wrestling. In 2009 he defeated France's Thomas La Ruffa for the World Heavy Middleweight Championship (formerly held by Mark Rocco, Fuji Yamada, Robbie Brookside, Bryan Danielson and others).

Gilbert was the owner and promoter of the Glasgow-based, women's wrestling promotion; Fierce Females and Source wrestling school.  He was removed from the Fierce Females promotion and his trainer role at Source Wrestling following abuse allegations stemming from the Speaking Out movement and sexting a young trainee.

Championships and accomplishments
All Star Wrestling 
British Tag Team Championship (1 time)
All Star People's Championship (1 time)
World Heavy Middleweight Championship (1 time)
British Championship Wrestling 
BCW Tag Team Championship (1 time)
Insane Championship Wrestling
 ICW Heavyweight Championship (1 time)
ICW Zero-G Championship (1 time)
ICW Bammy Award for "Feud of the Year" with BT Gunn (2015)
ICW "Match of the Year" Bammy Award - for Legion (Mikey Whiplash, Tommy End & Michael Dante) vs New Age Kliq (BT Gunn, Chris Renfrew & Wolfgang) at Fear & Loathing VIII (2015)
 Square Go Contract (Fourth Annual Square Go 2013)
International Pro Wrestling: United Kingdom 
IPW:UK Tag Team Championship (1 time)
Pride Wrestling 
Pride Wrestling Championship (1 time)
Revolution Pro Wrestling
Undisputed British Tag Team Championship (1 time) – with Robbie Dynamite
Rock N Wrestle
RNW Highland Championship (1 time, current)
Scottish Wrestling Alliance 
NWA Scottish Heavyweight Championship (1 time)
Target Wrestling
Target Wrestling Championship (1 time, current)
Target Wrestling Tag Team Championship (1 time)
 TNT Extreme Wrestling
DOA Deathmatch Tournament (2019)
TNT Extreme Division Championship (1 time)
Union of European Wrestling Alliances 
European Heavyweight Championship (1 time)
World Wide Wrestling League 
Seven Deadly Sins Tournament (2014)

References

External links
 

1980 births
Living people
English male professional wrestlers
Sportspeople from Stoke-on-Trent
Undisputed British Tag Team Champions